Heningkunglwa is a village in Peren district of Nagaland, India. It is located in the Pedi (Ngwalwa) Circle.

Demographics 

According to the 2011 census of India, Heningkunglwa has 330 households. The effective literacy rate (i.e. the literacy rate of population excluding children aged 6 and below) is 86.94%.

References 

Villages in Pedi (Ngwalwa) Circle